Jonathon Prandi (born August 11, 1972) is an American male fashion model, actor and IT-consultant. He was born in Kalamazoo, Michigan and grew up in Miami, Florida. Jonathon Prandi has been modeling for fashion shows, catalogs and magazines and has appeared in training videos and fitness- and training magazines such as Men's Health, Men's Workout, and Exercise for Men.

He has also appeared several times in Playgirl Magazine, the first time in February 1996. In the September 1996 issue he was their Centerfold, and in 1997 he was Playgirl Magazine's "Man of the Year."

He has appeared in TV shows like Guiding Light, Entertainment Tonight and Extra, and made guest appearances on Fox After Breakfast, Good Day New York, and The Montel Williams Show.

Prandi has also appeared on stage and in films; for example, he played the villain in the Off Broadway Play The Three Musketeers, and he also played himself in the independent film Three's A Crowd. He had a role in Deadly Ties as well as in the independent film Passion Fruits. Jonathon also was Pierce Brosnan's body double in the film The Thomas Crown Affair in 1999.

Prandi also holds a B.S. degree in information technology and an A.S. degree in computer information systems, and has in recent years started a successful web design company.

According to his Playgirl interview, Jonathan is of Italian-American and Native-American ancestry

Filmography
 Little Shop of Erotica 
 Guiding Light
 Entertainment Tonight
 Extra
 Fox After Breakfast
 Good Day New York
 The Montel Williams Show
 Three's A Crowd
 Deadly Ties
 Passion Fruits
 The Thomas Crown Affair

Stage Appearances
 There's Something About Sparkles (performed Spring 2019)

External links

1972 births
Living people
Male models from Michigan
American male television actors
American consultants
American male erotic dancers
American people of Italian descent
People from Kalamazoo, Michigan
Male actors from Miami
Playgirl Men of the Month
Playgirl Men of the Year